The Battle of Tachekkirt was a battle between the French forces of Marshall Randon and the allied Algerian forces of Lalla Fatma N'Soumer and Sherif Boubaghla. 

The Algerian forces feared that the French would launch a surprise attack. Shortly after the appearance of Lalla Fatma N’Soumer and her reinforcements composed of Kabyle warriors, they assumed strategic positions and lookouts were placed. 

The battle took place on the 18th of July and the Algerian tribes were victorious over the French army led by Marshall Randon.  The French forces suffered a loss of 800 dead which included 56 officers and 371 injured.  Marshall Randon was almost captured during this battle but managed to escape. 

After this battle the leader Sherif Boubaghla was killed most likely by the betrayal of his own allies and N’Soumer took charge and commanded the resistance.

References

Conflicts in 1854
French colonial empire
Invasions by France
19th century in Algeria
Algerian War